The Salamanca Formation is a geologic formation in the Golfo San Jorge Basin of central Patagonia that yields well-preserved, well-dated fossils from the early Paleocene. Studies of these fossils are providing new data on plant and animal diversity following the end-Cretaceous extinction event.

The Salamanca Formation crops out in the San Jorge Basin in southern Chubut and northern Santa Cruz provinces, Argentina, overlying the Cretaceous Chubut Group and is part of the Paleocene and Eocene Río Chico Group. The formation yields abundant plant remains  as well as fossils of invertebrates, marine macrofaunas, reptiles, and mammals. The formation consists primarily of estuarine to shallow marine deposits.

Palynological analysis of the Salamanca Formation shows low floral diversity after the end-Cretaceous mass extinction, followed by a rapid recovery. 50% of all pollen types are angiosperms, whereas gymnosperms accounted for only ~13% of total richness; however, Classopollis pollen, representing the extinct conifer family Cheirolepidiaceae, is the most abundant palynomorph. Wood assemblages from the Salamanca Formation. are dominated by conifers, but the presence of fossil angiosperm woods indicate that they were also part of the canopy. The co-occurrence of palms, dicot woods with indistinct growth rings, and alligatorids, indicates temperature remained above freezing year-round. The results of leaf physiognomic analyses indicate that the climate in the San Jorge Basin during the early Paleocene was warm subtropical.

Paleoflora

Paleofauna

Fish

Amphibians

Reptiles

Testudines

Crocodylomorphs

Lepidosaurs

Mammals

Monotremes

Allotheres

Meridiolestidans

Meridiungulates

Metatherians

Invertebrates 
After unless otherwise noted

References 

 
Geologic formations of Argentina
Paleocene Series of South America
Paleogene Argentina
 
Tiupampan
Fossiliferous stratigraphic units of South America
Paleontology in Argentina
Sandstone formations
Mudstone formations
Tuff formations
Lacustrine deposits
Geology of Chubut Province
Geology of Santa Cruz Province, Argentina
Golfo San Jorge Basin